Southern Lehigh High School is a four-year public high school located in Center Valley, Pennsylvania in the Lehigh Valley region of eastern Pennsylvania. It is the only high school in the Southern Lehigh School District.

As of the 2021-22 school year, the school had an enrollment of 1,053 students, according to National Center for Education Statistics data.

The school's mascot is the Spartan, and the school colors are blue and white.

History
Southern Lehigh was built in 1955. Prior to its construction, some students in the district attended high school at William Allen High School in Allentown while others attended Coopersburg High School, which closed when Southern Lehigh opened in 1955.

Athletics

Southern Lehigh High School is a member of the Pennsylvania Interscholastic Athletic Association's District XI and most of its sports compete in the Colonial League. Southern Lehigh High School is one of eleven Lehigh Valley-area high schools with an ice hockey team; it competes in the Lehigh Valley Scholastic Ice Hockey League.

Student organizations and clubs

FIRST Robotics team 
Southern Lehigh High School's FIRST Robotics Competition team, the Spartechs, has participated in the FIRST Robotics Competition since 2002. The robotics team has competed at the FIRST Championship in 2016 and 2017.

Speech and debate team 
Southern Lehigh's speech and debate team was started in 1992 and has competed at multiple national and state tournaments. It has recorded five PHSSL state champions. The team competes in the Pennsylvania High School Speech League, the National Catholic Forensic League, and the National Speech and Debate Association competitions.

Notable alumni 
Noel LaMontagne, former professional football player, Cleveland Browns
Jimmie Schaffer, former professional baseball player, Chicago Cubs, Chicago White Sox, Cincinnati Reds, New York Mets, Philadelphia Phillies, and St. Louis Cardinals
Justin Simmons, former Pennsylvania State Representative

References

External links
Official website
Southern Lehigh High School sports coverage at The Express-Times

1957 establishments in Pennsylvania
Educational institutions established in 1957
Public high schools in Pennsylvania
Schools in Lehigh County, Pennsylvania